James Andrew O'Hara (19 September 1874 – 14 July 1960) was an Australian rules footballer who played for the South Melbourne Football Club in the Victorian Football League (VFL).

He was the younger brother of Jack and Frank, who also played for South Melbourne.

References

External links 

1874 births
1960 deaths
Australian rules footballers from Melbourne
Sydney Swans players
People from South Melbourne